Flirting Scholar 2 is a 2010 Chinese comedy film directed by Hong Kong director Lee Lik-Chi and starring Huang Xiaoming, Zhang Jingchu, Natalis Chan, Zhou Libo and Richie Ren. It is a prequel to the 1993 Hong Kong film Flirting Scholar which starred Stephen Chow and also directed by Lee.

Cast
 Huang Xiaoming as Tang Bohu
 Zhang Jingchu as Qiu Xiang
 Natalis Chan as Chuk Chi Shan
 Cheng Pei-pei as Madame Wah
 Kingdom Yuen as Shek Lau
 Mimi Chu as Chussy

External links
 Flirting Scholar 2 at Wu-Jing.org
 
 
 Flirting Scholar 2 at Hong Kong Cinemagic

2010 films
2010s Mandarin-language films
2010 comedy films
Chinese comedy films
Films set in 15th-century Ming dynasty